Brian Tavarus Jones (born August 23, 1981) is a former American football tight end. After playing college football at the University of Louisiana at Lafayette and University of Arkansas at Pine Bluff, Jones was signed as an undrafted free agent by the Jacksonville Jaguars in 2004. Jones has also been a member of the New England Patriots.

Early years
Jones played high school football at Bastrop High School, where he recorded 30 receptions for 500 yards and eight touchdowns as a senior and earned All-District and All-State honors.

College career
Jones then attended the University of Louisiana at Lafayette where he played in eight games, starting two as a freshman and caught six passes for 38 yards. He played in 11 games as a sophomore a caught five passes for 30 yards. He then sat out the 2001 season after transferring from Louisiana-Lafayette to University of Arkansas at Pine Bluff. He started 10 games as a junior and had 35 receptions for 421 yards and three touchdowns. He started in 10 games as a senior, where he caught 30 passes for 493 yards and three touchdowns.

Professional career
Jones was signed as an undrafted free agent in 2004 by the Jacksonville Jaguars. In 2004, he played in all 16 games, catching six passes for 87 yards and one touchdown.

External links
 New England Patriots profile

1981 births
Living people
American football tight ends
Arkansas–Pine Bluff Golden Lions football players
Louisiana Ragin' Cajuns football players
Jacksonville Jaguars players
People from Bastrop, Louisiana
Players of American football from Louisiana